The Kochi International Container Transshipment Terminal (ICTT), locally known as the Vallarpadam Terminal, is the first transshipment terminal in India and the first container terminal to operate in a SEZ. It is part of the Cochin Port in Kochi, Kerala.

Being constructed in three stages, the first phase of the terminal was commissioned on 11 Feb 2011. This can handle cargo up to one million TEUs (twenty-foot equivalent units) per annum. On completion of the third phase, the terminal will be able to handle 5.5 million Twenty-foot equivalent units (TEUs)  of cargo per annum. The terminal is operated by the Dubai Ports World (DPW), which will operate it for 30-years after which the control will come back to the Cochin Port Trust.

History
Container Transshipment Terminal, Kochi first came to the mind of Dr. Babu Paul IAS, He proposed this project to K Karunakaran but the central government was not interested in this project. On 16 February 2005, Dubai Ports World announced that it has signed an agreement with the Cochin Port Trust (CoPT) to construct, develop and operate an International Container Transshipment Terminal (ICTT) – An India Gateway Terminal – at Vallarpadam.

The project was, formally, launched with the laying of the foundation stone by Manmohan Singh, the Prime Minister of India. Approval for the agreement was given by the Cabinet Committee of Economic Affairs of the Government of India, Ministry of Finance and meanwhile, the DP World will manage and subsequently transfer its operations at the Rajiv Gandhi Container Terminal in Cochin Port to the new terminal upon its completion. The DP World has been granted a 38-year concession for the exclusive operation and management of the site.

Overview

Vallarpadam Terminal is the first in the country to operate in a special economic zone.

 In the first phase there will be 600 m Quay length and a draft of more than 15 m, when the terminal may handle 1 million TEUs
 In the second phase the capacity will be enhanced to 3 million TEUs.
 In the third phase the terminal may handle even up to 5.5 million TEUs.

The total cost of the project is estimated at  3200 crore.

DP World has estimated that the total initial investment required will be approximately US$20 million which includes the immediate provision of four RTGs and two Mobile Harbour Cranes to the Terminal -to improve yard handling, truck turnaround time and quayside operations.

Strategically, located on the main east–west global shipping lines and offering draft of about 16 m, Cochin is destined to develop as the premier gateway to southern India, as also offering an alternative to Sri Lanka and Singapore for containers being transshipped for the Indian market.

Location
The terminal is located in the Vallarpadam island in Kochi.

Opening
On 11 February 2011 the terminal was inaugurated by Manmohan Singh, the Prime Minister of India. 
The ceremony was attended by A. K. Antony, G. K. Vasan, K.C. Venugopal, R. S. Gavai, V. S. Achuthanandan, K. V. Thomas, Vayalar Ravi, C P Joshi, Mullapaly Ramachandran, and N Ramachandran.

Timeline

 1 February 2005: Commenced Construction for Phase 1
 16 February 2005: Concession Agreement Signed
 9 February 2011: First Train arrived at ICTT
 11 February 2011: Dr.Manmohan Singh Prime Minister of India Dedicated ICTT to the nation
 12 February 2011: First Containers Arrived at ICTT
 18 February 2011: First Vessel Arrived at ICTT ( OEL Dubai)
 6 December 2020: Arrival of MV. Maersk Edinburgh (largest vessel handled at ICTT)

See also
 Vembanad Bridge
 National Highway 47C (India)
 Inland port
 Kochi LNG Terminal

References

 Prime Minister inaugurates Rs 3,200 cr ICTT at Cochin Port 
 PM to open container terminal in Kerala 
 Vallarpadam terminal: DP World submits plan to Kochi port 
 Ineptness delays Vallarpadam container terminal 
 Kochi Port can opt to operate box terminal -Trade Union 
 6 new generation cranes arrive at Vallarpadam 
 Radioactive detectors to be installed at ports 
 Mammoth cranes for Vallarpadam arrive 

Buildings and structures in Kochi
Economy of Kochi
Container terminals
Companies based in Kochi
Foreign trade of India
Transport in Kochi
Indian companies established in 2011
Logistics in India
2011 establishments in Kerala
History of Kerala (1947–present)